In mathematics, the Mazur–Ulam theorem states that if  and  are normed spaces over R and the mapping 

 

is a surjective isometry, then  is affine.  It was proved by Stanisław Mazur and Stanisław Ulam in response to a question raised by Stefan Banach.

For strictly convex spaces the result is true, and easy, even for isometries which are not necessarily surjective.

Therefore  is an affine map. This argument fails in the general case, because in a normed space which is not strictly convex two tangent balls may meet in some flat convex region of their boundary, not just a single point.

See also
Aleksandrov–Rassias problem

References
 
 
 
 

Normed spaces
Theorems in functional analysis